Arthur William Ashton Peel, 2nd Earl Peel (29 May 1901 – 22 September 1969), styled Viscount Clanfield from 1929 to 1937, was a British peer.

Peel was the son of William Peel, 1st Earl Peel, by the Honourable Eleanor "Ella" Williamson, daughter of James Williamson, 1st Baron Ashton. He was a great-grandson of Prime Minister Robert Peel. He became known by the courtesy title Viscount Clanfield when his father was elevated to an earldom in 1929. In 1937 he succeeded in the earldom on the death of his father. He succeeded to the family baronetcy in 1942 on the death of the 6th baronet, his second cousin once removed. In 1948 he was appointed Lord-Lieutenant of Lancashire, a post he held until 1951.

Lord Peel married Kathleen McGrath, daughter of Michael McGrath, on 11 March 1946. They had two sons. He died in September 1969, aged 68, and was succeeded by his eldest son, William.

References

1901 births
1969 deaths
Earls in the Peerage of the United Kingdom
Lord-Lieutenants of Lancashire
Arthur
Viscounts Peel
Peel baronets